Duhamel is a town and municipality in the Outaouais region of Quebec, Canada. It is the largest municipality in surface area in the Papineau Regional County Municipality.

Its western portion consists mostly of undeveloped Laurentian Hills, part of the Papineau-Labelle Wildlife Reserve. The town itself is located along the Petite-Nation River between Lake Simon and Lake Gagnon.

History
In the mid 19th century, the area's forests were being exploited. Duhamel, which used to be called Preston, formed shortly after when its first settlers were assigned land, while logging continued to be the dominant factor for its colonization. By 1880, a post office existed bearing the name Duhamel, named in honour of Joseph-Thomas Duhamel (1841–1909), second bishop of Ottawa from 1874 to 1909. In 1888, the Mission of Notre-Dame-du-Mont-Carmel opened. In 1892, the Township of Preston was formed (named after Frederick Stanley, 16th Earl of Derby, Baron of Preston, and governor general of Canada from 1888 to 1893).

Starting in 1925, the Singer Company, best known for its sewing machines, built a railway through Duhamel linking Thurso to Lake Montjoie (in Lac-Ernest unorganized territory). The railroad was used until 1980 when it was dismantled and converted to a tourism corridor.

On August 15, 1936, the Municipality of Duhamel was formed when it separated from the United Township Municipality of Hartwell-et-Preston.

On December 21, 1985, Duhamel annexed a portion of the unorganized territories of Lac-du-Sourd and Lac-des-Écorces, and again on October 10, 1998, it annexed the northern portion of Lac-des-Écorces.

Demographics

Mother tongue:
 English as first language: 7.0%
 French as first language: 91.2%
 English and French as first language: 0.9%
 Other as first language: 0.9%

Local government

Duhamel forms part of the federal electoral district of Argenteuil—La Petite-Nation and has been represented by Stéphane Lauzon of the Liberal Party since 2015. Provincially, Duhamel is part of the Papineau electoral district and is represented by Mathieu Lacombe of the Coalition Avenir Québec since 2018.

List of former mayors:
 Télesphore Tremblay, 1936 – 1941
 Lionel Ethier, 1941 – 1949
 René Pilon, 1949 – 1950
 Fréréole Filion, 1950 – 1951
 Arthur Lamontagne, 1951 – 1954
 Lionel Éthier, 1954 – 1955
 Camille Poliquin, 1955 – 1976
 Jean Turcot, 1976 – 1979
 Martial Brière, 1979 – 1981
 Yvon Jérôme, 1981 – 1985
 Phil Patry, 1985 – 1997
 Yvon Charlebois, 1997 – 2005
 Richard Chartrand, 2005 – 2009
 David Pharand 2009 -

References

External links

Incorporated places in Outaouais
Municipalities in Quebec